Prabhu Jagatbandhu College, also known as Andul College, (Bengali: প্রভু জগৎবন্ধু কলেজ) is an undergraduate college at Andul in Howrah district, West Bengal, India. It is affiliated with the University of Calcutta. The college was established in the year of 1964.

History

Departments
UG (Undergraduate)

Science
Physics
Mathematics
Computer Science
Chemistry
Botany
Zoology
Food and Nutrition

Humanities, Social Sciences and Commerce
Bengali
English
Education
History
Geography
Physical  Education
Political Science
Philosophy
Economics
Sanskrit
Sociology
Commerce

PG (Post Graduate)
Geography
Bengali
Mathematics

Accreditation
Prabhu Jagatbandhu College is recognized by the University Grants Commission (UGC). Recently, it has been re-accredited and awarded C grade by the National Assessment and Accreditation Council (NAAC).

See also 
List of colleges affiliated to the University of Calcutta
Education in India
Education in West Bengal

References

External links
 Prabhu Jagatbandhu College

Educational institutions established in 1964
University of Calcutta affiliates
Universities and colleges in Howrah district
1964 establishments in West Bengal